The Whale EP is a self-released EP by Wild Sweet Orange. It contains 5 songs and has a running time of 20 minutes and 20 seconds.

EP track listing
 "Wrestle With God" - 4:05
 "Tilt (Acoustic)" - 5:16
 "Be Careful (What You Want)" - 3:31
 "Land of No Return" - 4:17
 "I'm Coming Home" - 3:13

References

External links
Official site
Myspace

2007 EPs
Wild Sweet Orange albums